Colias scudderii, the willow sulphur, is a butterfly in the family Pieridae. It is found from Alaska south through the Rocky Mountains to northern New Mexico. The habitat consists of mountain meadows and willow bogs.

The upper surface of the males is lemon yellow with a dark wide border cut by yellow veins. Females are often white, with a small black cell spot. The border is incomplete or lacking. The underside of both sexes is dirty green. Adults are on wing from June to August. They feed on flower nectar.

The larvae feed on the leaves of Salix species (including Salix reticulata, Salix lutea and Salix planifolia). Second, third, and fourth instar larvae hibernate.

Subspecies
Colias scudderii scudderii (Colorado, Utah, New Mexico, Wyoming)
Colias scudderii ruckesi Klots, 1937 (New Mexico)

References

scudderii
Butterflies described in 1865
Butterflies of North America